"" (At the feast), WAB 59a, is a song composed by the 19-year-old Anton Bruckner in 1843 during his stay as schoolteacher's assistant in Kronstorf. In 1893, near the end of his life, Bruckner modified slightly its music score and let Karl Ptak put another text on the song, with as title "" (Table song), WAB 59c.

History 
Bruckner composed this youth work on a five-strophe text of the parish priest of Kronstorf, Alois Knauer, in 1843, during his stay as schoolteacher's assistant. He dedicated it to Josef Ritter von Pessler, the parish priest of Enns. The work was performed on 19 September 1843 in the church of Enns. The work, of which the original manuscript is stored in the archive of the Stadt- und Landsbibliothek (City and province library) of Vienna, was first issued in Band I, pp. 231-233, of the Göllerich/Auer biography.

Tafellied 
Near the end of his life, Bruckner let Karl Ptak put another text on the song and modified slightly its music score, with as title Tafellied (Table song), WAB 59c.

Later issues 
In 1928, Anton Böhm & Sohn issued a new version of Bruckner's popular song transposed to D major with a text by Ludwig Carl Kraus, with the title Festlied (Festive song). This new issue of the song, which was originally classified by Renate Grasberger as WAB 67, is now put as WAB 59b.Two years later (1930), Anton Böhm & Sohn issued again a new version in C major for mixed choir with a text by Alfred Zehelein.

Text 
An dem Feste uses a text by Alois Knauer.

Music 
The 20-bar long work (16 bars plus repeat of the last 4 bars) in D-flat major, which is scored for  choir, uses five strophes.  There is also a setting for  choir.The revised, 16-bar long Tafellied uses three strophes.

Discography

An dem Feste 
There is a single recording of the original setting :
 Thomas Kerbl, Männerchorvereinigung Bruckner 12, Weltliche Männerchöre – CD: LIVA 054, 2012 – 1st and 5th strophes

References

Sources 
 August Göllerich, Anton Bruckner. Ein Lebens- und Schaffens-Bild,  – posthumous edited by Max Auer by G. Bosse, Regensburg, 1932
 Anton Bruckner – Sämtliche Werke, Band XXIII/2:  Weltliche Chorwerke (1843–1893), Musikwissenschaftlicher Verlag der Internationalen Bruckner-Gesellschaft, Angela Pachovsky and Anton Reinthaler (Editor), Vienna, 1989
 Cornelis van Zwol, Anton Bruckner 1824–1896 – Leven en werken, uitg. Thoth, Bussum, Netherlands, 2012. 
 Uwe Harten, Anton Bruckner. Ein Handbuch. , Salzburg, 1996. .
 Crawford Howie, Anton Bruckner - A documentary biography, online revised edition

External links 
 
 An dem Feste Des-Dur, WAB 59; Festlied D-Dur, WAB 67; Tafellied Des-Dur, WAB 86 – Critical discography by Hans Roelofs 
 A life performance of An dem Feste (4 October 2014) can be heard on YouTube at 2:49 min of Volksmusik vom Ansfeldner 5' Gsang und eine Lesung über Anton Bruckner - Mixed vocal quartet, strophes 1 & 2.
 A live performance of Festlied, WAB 59c by the Wagner Society Male Choir of Japan, 11 December 1988, can be heard on YouTube: Festlied

Weltliche Chorwerke by Anton Bruckner
1843 compositions
Compositions in D-flat major